Dirk Uipko Stikker  (5 February 1897 – 23 December 1979) was a Dutch politician and diplomat of the defunct Liberal State Party (LSP), co-founder of the defunct Freedom Party (PvdV) and of the People's Party for Freedom and Democracy (VVD), and businessman. Stikker was known for his abilities as a manager and negotiator. Stikker continued to comment on political affairs as a statesman until his death. He holds the distinction as the first Secretary General of NATO from the Netherlands.

Biography

Early life
Born in Winschoten, he studied law at the University of Groningen. After his studies he began a career in the banking sector. In 1935, he became director of Heineken International, the famous beer company. He held this post until 1948. In 1945, he was among the organizers of the Stichting van de Arbeid (Dutch Labour Foundation), thus helping to lay the foundation of post-war collective bargaining in the Netherlands.

Career
From 1922 until 1926, Stikker worked as an accountant for the Twentsche Bank, and then as Director of a branch of the bank from 1926 until 1928.  Then in 1928 until 1935 Stikker worked as a regional manager for the Twentsche Bank. Stikker worked as member of the management board for Heineken N.V. from 1 July 1935 until 1 August 1948 and as chairman of that board from 1940 until 1948. Following the end of World War II, Queen Wilhelmina ordered a Recall of Parliament and Stikker became a Member of the Senate taking the place of the deceased Samuel van den Bergh, on 20 November 1945. On 23 March 1946, the Liberal State Party was renamed as the Freedom Party. Stikker was one of the co-founders and became the Leader of the Freedom Party and Chairman. On 24 January 1948, the Freedom Party (PvdV) and the Committee-Oud  merged to form the People's Party for Freedom and Democracy (VVD). Stikker was one of the co-founders and became the first Chairman of the People's Party for Freedom and Democracy.

After election of 1948 the Leader of the People's Party for Freedom and Democracy and Parliamentary leader of the People's Party for Freedom and Democracy in the House of Representatives Pieter Oud opted to remain in the House of Representatives instead of accepting a ministerial post in the new Cabinet Drees–Van Schaik and endorsed Stikker who had been serving as the Deputy Leader as Minister of Foreign Affairs, taking office on 7 August 1948. The Cabinet Drees–Van Schaik fell on 24 January 1951 and was replaced by the Cabinet Drees I with Stikker continuing as Minister of Foreign Affairs, taking office on 15 March 1951. In February 1952 Stikker announced that he would not stand for the election of 1952. The Cabinet Drees I was succeeded by the Cabinet Drees II on 2 September 1952. Stikker remained in active politics, he was appointed as the Ambassador of the Netherlands to the United Kingdom, serving from 10 September 1952 until 15 June 1958 when he was appointed as the Permanent Representative of the Netherlands to NATO and the OECD. In April 1961 Stikker was nominated as the next Secretary General of NATO. He resigned as Permanent Representative on 21 April 1961 the day he was installed as Secretary General, serving from 21 April 1961 until 1 August 1964.

After election of 1948 the Leader of the People's Party for Freedom and Democracy and Parliamentary leader of the People's Party for Freedom and Democracy in the House of Representatives Pieter Oud opted to remain in the House of Representatives instead of accepting a ministerial post in the new Cabinet Drees–Van Schaik and endorsed Stikker who had been serving as the Deputy Leader as Minister of Foreign Affairs, taking office on 7 August 1948. The Cabinet Drees–Van Schaik fell on 24 January 1951 and was replaced by the Cabinet Drees I with Stikker continuing as Minister of Foreign Affairs, taking office on 15 March 1951. In February 1952 Stikker announced that he would not stand for the election of 1952. The Cabinet Drees I was succeeded by the Cabinet Drees II on 2 September 1952. Stikker remained in active politics, he was appointed as the Ambassador of the Netherlands to the United Kingdom, serving from 10 September 1952 until 15 June 1958 when he was appointed as the Permanent Representative of the Netherlands to NATO and the OECD. In April 1961 Stikker was nominated as the next Secretary General of NATO. He resigned as Permanent Representative on 21 April 1961 the day he was installed as Secretary General, serving from 21 April 1961 until 1 August 1964.

After his retirement, Stikker occupied numerous seats as a corporate director and nonprofit director for supervisory boards in the business and industry world and for supervisory boards for several international non-governmental organizations and research institutes (Unilever, Van Lanschot, Netherlands Atlantic Association, Carnegie Foundation, Trilateral Commission and the DSM Company) and as an advocate and lobbyist for European integration and serving on several commissions for the European Economic Community and state commissions on behalf of the Dutch government. He served as the Secretary General of NATO from 21 April 1961 until 1 August 1964.

Politics

Stikker entered politics in 1945, when he was elected to the Senate of the States General. On 23 March 1946, he co-founded the Partij van de Vrijheid (PvdV, Freedom Party), together with some former members of the pre-war Liberale Staatspartij (LSP, Liberal State Party). On 24 January 1948, the PvdV was absorbed by the Volkspartij voor Vrijheid en Democratie (VVD, Peoples Party for Freedom and Democracy), which is  the country's most important Liberal party. Stikker was the VVD's first chairman.

Minister of Foreign Affairs
In 1948, Stikker became minister of foreign affairs in the first government led by Willem Drees, holding that position until 1951. After his party adopted a no-confidence motion over the government's colonial policy in New Guinea, Stikker resigned on 23 January 1951, prompting the cabinet's fall. He returned to that position less than two months later.  The Netherlands played an important role in the creation of NATO and the European Coal and Steel Community during Stikker's time in office as minister of foreign affairs.

Ambassador
After his ministerial office, Stikker was ambassador to the United Kingdom (1952–1958) and head of the Dutch Permanent Representation to the North Atlantic Council and to the Organization for European Economic Co-operation, the predecessor of the OECD (1958–1961).

Secretary General of NATO
On 21 April 1961 he succeeded Paul-Henri Spaak to become the third Secretary General of NATO. He resigned due to poor health on 1 August 1964.

Personal
In 1964, Stikker was awarded an honorary doctorate by Brown University. He died in Wassenaar in 1979, aged 82.

Further reading
 Wilsford, David, ed. Political leaders of contemporary Western Europe: a biographical dictionary (Greenwood, 1995) pp. 427–32.

Decorations

References

External links

Official
  Mr. D.U. (Dirk) Stikker Parlement & Politiek
  Mr. D.U. Stikker (VVD) Eerste Kamer der Staten-Generaal

 

 

 

 

 

1897 births
1979 deaths
Ambassadors of the Netherlands to the United Kingdom
Chairmen of the People's Party for Freedom and Democracy
Cold War diplomats
Commanders of the Order of the Netherlands Lion
Dutch bankers
Van Lanschot Kempen people
Dutch chief executives in the finance industry
Dutch corporate directors
Dutch nonprofit directors
Dutch male badminton players
Dutch trade association executives
Dutch people of World War II
Dutch political party founders
Grand Croix of the Légion d'honneur
Grand Crosses 1st class of the Order of Merit of the Federal Republic of Germany
Grand Crosses of the Order of the Crown (Belgium)
Grand Crosses of the Order of the Phoenix (Greece)
Heineken people
Members of the Senate (Netherlands)
Ministers of Foreign Affairs of the Netherlands
Secretaries General of NATO
Liberal State Party politicians
Knights Grand Cross of the Order of Orange-Nassau
Knights Grand Cross of the Order of Merit of the Italian Republic
Permanent Representatives of the Netherlands to NATO
Honorary Knights Grand Cross of the Order of the British Empire
Honorary Knights Grand Cross of the Royal Victorian Order
People from Winschoten
People from Wassenaar
People's Party for Freedom and Democracy politicians
Freedom Party (Netherlands) politicians
University of Groningen alumni
20th-century Dutch businesspeople
20th-century Dutch civil servants
20th-century Dutch diplomats
20th-century Dutch politicians